Yingze District is one of six districts of the prefecture-level city of Taiyuan, the capital of Shanxi Province, North China.

References

www.xzqh.org 

County-level divisions of Shanxi